Almaș is a commune in Arad County, Romania. Its total administrative territory is 8127 ha.

Population
According to the last census the population of the commune counts 3009 inhabitants. From an ethnic point of view, it has the following structure: 96.3% are Romanians, 0.2% Hungarians, 3.4% Roma and 0.1% are of other or undeclared nationalities.

History
The first documentary record of the locality Almaș dates back to 1334. Cil was mentioned in documents in 1369, Rădești in 1441, and Joia Mare in 1439.

Tourism
There is a monastery dedicated to the Annunciation, and the Rădeștilor Valley.

References

Communes in Arad County
Localities in Crișana